Lindley is a village and civil parish in the Harrogate district of North Yorkshire, England. It is near Lindley Wood Reservoir and 1 mile north of Otley. In 2001 the parish had a population of 52. The population was estimated at 50 in 2015.

History 
The name "Lindley" means 'Lime-tree wood/clearing'. Lindley was formerly a township in Otley parish, in 1866 Lindley became a civil parish in its own right.

References

External links

Villages in North Yorkshire
Civil parishes in North Yorkshire
Borough of Harrogate